Litsea leiantha is a species of plant in the family Lauraceae. It is endemic to India. It is only found on South Andaman Island, an island in the South Pacific.  It is threatened by habitat loss.

References

leiantha
Flora of the Andaman Islands
Endangered plants
Taxonomy articles created by Polbot